Dworshak Dam is a concrete gravity dam in the western United States, on the North Fork of the Clearwater River in north central Idaho.

Construction of the dam by the U.S. Army Corps of Engineers (USACE) began in 1966 and was completed in 1973.

Lacking fish ladders, the dam blocks fish passage and completely extirpated anadromous fish migration into the upper reaches of the North Fork and its tributaries in Idaho.

History
The proposal for Dworshak Dam originated in a 1953 USACE survey of the lower Snake River drainage basin for suitable sites to develop reservoir storage and hydroelectric power generation. Dworshak was one of seven dam sites considered on the Snake, Salmon and Clearwater River systems. The project was authorized on October 23, 1962, as Bruces Eddy  the name was later changed to honor Senator Henry Dworshak (1894–1962), who was instrumental in gaining congressional approval for the 

The dam was controversial from the start, because it would block fish migration and its reservoir would flood a large portion of the winter range of elk in the Clearwater River basin. The North Fork of the Clearwater River had an excellent run of steelhead trout and "may have been the finest population of large-size steelhead in the world". However, proponents of the project held that the construction of a fish hatchery would maintain the river's steelhead runs, and that the construction of the dam would render other dam projects in the Clearwater River basin unnecessary. Another big incentive for the project was flood control; supporters of Dworshak cited a devastating flood in 1948, when the Clearwater River reached a peak of —eleven times its normal flow—as further reason for the construction of a large storage dam.

Excavation of keyways in the canyon walls to provide future foundations for the concrete commenced in 1966, and continued through 1968. The first bucket of concrete was placed in early 1968, and by May 28, 1969, more than  had been poured in the dam. The diversion tunnel was closed on September 27, 1971, allowing the reservoir to begin filling, and the last concrete was poured on the dam crest on January 27, 1973. Three generating units of the power plant were also installed in 1973, and by March 1, the reservoir had risen to a sufficient level to allow power generation to begin. The reservoir first reached full capacity on July 3, 1973.

After the dam was completed, the USACE acquired  of land adjacent to the reservoir (later expanded to ), and has since managed it for winter habitat of elk and white-tailed deer. Because Dworshak Dam is too high for a fish ladder to be economically feasible, the USACE constructed the Dworshak National Fish Hatchery (DNFH) at a cost of $21 million to mitigate losses of the North Fork steelhead run caused by Dworshak Dam. The hatchery is located on the small peninsula of land between the North Fork and the main Clearwater River directly above their confluence. Now operated by the National Fish Hatchery System, the fish hatchery actually went into operation in April 1969, four years before the dam was completed. The hatchery has a capacity of 6,000 adult fish, and releases about 3.4 million juveniles into the river system each year.

The Dworshak Dam power station was designed to accommodate six generating units for purposes of peaking power production. However, this form of operation would cause excessively large flow fluctuations on the North Fork Clearwater River, and the main Clearwater River below their confluence at Ahsahka. A dam was to be built on the Clearwater River above Lenore to provide a forebay for smoothing out Dworshak releases, but due to opposition by local residents it was never built. Although it would have been fitted with a fish ladder, the Lenore dam would have affected steelhead and salmon migration to the entire upper Clearwater River and its tributaries, including the South Fork, Middle Fork, Lochsa, and Selway Rivers. In addition, the flooding caused by its -long reservoir would require the relocation of the Dworshak fish hatchery. The proposed fifth and sixth units of the plant were deauthorized in 1990, and the fourth unit was deauthorized in 1995.

Workers had to drill  diameter drain holes between the cracks and the dam's existing foundation drainage system, or "drainage gallery", at  intervals, relieving the pressure on the dam's backside.

Seventy drainage holes were drilled into the crack to relieve pressure before the crack was permanently sealed by an aggregate of cement, volcanic ash, and sawdust. The cost of the repair exceeded $1 million.

Specifications

High water releases are controlled by a set of outlet works with four gates, capable of releasing , and a spillway controlled by two  tainter gates. Dworshak Reservoir is the name of the lake formed behind the dam.

The overload capacity of the two small units is 103.5 MW and for the large unit is 253.0 MW, for a total of 460 MW. If installed, Units 4, 5, and 6, each with a capacity of 220 MW, would bring the total generating capacity to 1,060 MW, making it one of the largest hydroelectric plants in Idaho.

Operations

Most of the active capacity not used for flood control is used for power production. Because the Lenore dam on the Clearwater River was never built, Dworshak cannot be used as a peaking power facility. Thus, the power plant is operated as a base load plant, with a relatively constant release. Discharge rates from the dam only increase significantly during high water summers, when flooding requires the opening of the spillways. The power plant generates an average of 1.693 billion KWh each year. Water releases from Dworshak Dam are also controlled to optimize power generation at four downstream dams on the Snake River and four more on the Columbia River.

However, annual flood control reservations vary with the amount of snowpack in the  drainage basin above the dam. The annual flood-control drawdown generally begins in September and ends on April 1 of the following year; snowmelt floods are captured in the reservoir between April and July. Flood storage space in Dworshak can be interchanged with other major dams in the Columbia River system, including large Columbia mainstem dams such as Grand Coulee, depending on varying flood control requirements in the Columbia Basin.

Water releases from Dworshak are also timed to benefit Pacific salmon and steelhead migration in the Clearwater, Snake and Columbia Rivers. During late summer  through the fall, large volumes of cold water are released through the dam's low level outlets to help cool water in downstream rivers, creating more suitable temperatures for these fish species.

Tourism and economy
One of the major benefits touted by proponents of the Dworshak Dam was that it would provide recreation and associated economic benefits to local residents. The annual visitation to Dworshak is estimated at between 110,000 and 140,000 people, mostly during the summer high water months. Recreational activities include boating, water-skiing, camping, fishing, hiking and hunting; six boat ramps lie adjacent to the reservoir. The uppermost arm of the reservoir extends into the Clearwater National Forest. A regional visitor center is located at Dworshak Dam, and tours are available of the dam itself. However, the large annual drawdown of the reservoir causes boat ramps and marinas to be out of reach for months each year and an unsightly "bathtub ring" to be visible along the shoreline. A study by the University of Idaho calculated that this mode of operation causes the loss of between $4.5–5.9 million of tourism revenues each year.

The creation of a slackwater pool along  of the North Fork formerly assisted logging operations in the region, although the scale of the lumber industry has decreased significantly since the 20th century. About 81 million board feet were transported on Dworshak Reservoir between 1988 and 1991; however, logs have not been barged on the lake since 1991. This is in part because of the implementation of a late-summer flow augmentation scheme that requires greater drawdowns of the reservoir, putting log-handling facilities well above the water level, and also because of the development of backcountry logging roads that allow more efficient transport by truck. It has been suggested that some of Dworshak's flood control space be shifted to Grand Coulee Dam in northern Washington to provide increased water for flow augmentation; this would carry the added benefits of improving recreation on the lake.

See also

List of largest reservoirs in the United States
List of the tallest dams in the United States

References

Works cited

External links

Dworshak Dam and Reservoir – U.S. Army Corps of Engineers
Dworshak Visitor Center – U.S. Army Corps of Engineers
The Dworshak Dam Collection from the University of Idaho Library Digital Collections – Digitized photographs and documents pertaining to the planning, development and construction of the Dworshak Dam, featuring documents and photographs detailing both the legislative and physical development of the dam.

Buildings and structures in Clearwater County, Idaho
Dams in Idaho
Hydroelectric power plants in Idaho
Reservoirs in Idaho
United States Army Corps of Engineers dams
Dams completed in 1973
Energy infrastructure completed in 1973
Gravity dams
1973 establishments in Idaho